The Lost Treasure of the Grand Canyon is a 2008 adventure sci-fi movie set in the Grand Canyon, directed by Farhad Mann. The movie was due to be released in late November 2008 but the date was pushed back to December 20, 2008, due to unfinished filming. The film was released on DVD on May 26, 2009.

Plot
In the late 19th century, a team of Smithsonian researchers have stumbled across a lost walled Aztec city guarded by a "great flying serpent of death." As days turn to weeks, Susan Jordan, the daughter of the professor leading the expedition, assembles a team to rescue her father and his colleagues from the clutches of the ancient Aztec warriors and their horrible serpent god.

Cast
 Michael Shanks as Jacob Thain
 Shannen Doherty as Susan Jordan
 JR Bourne as Marco Langford
 Toby Berner as Steward Dunbar
 Heather Doerksen as Hildy Wainwright
 Duncan Fraser as Dr. Samuel Jordon
 Peter New as Isaac Preston

Production
The production for this film began in February 2008. Filming began on April 26, 2008 and ended on May 14, 2008, a 19-day stretch, in Kamloops, British Columbia and Thompson-Nicola Region, British Columbia.

Reception
The film's reception was generally poor receiving an average of 4 out of 10 stars on IMDb. Many blame this on the poor CGI, an incoherent storyline, and "d-grade" acting.

References

External links
 
 
 

2008 films
2000s action adventure films
Canadian action adventure films
English-language Canadian films
Canadian television films
Action television films
Adventure television films
Films set in Arizona
Aztecs in fiction
Films directed by Farhad Mann
Syfy original films
Films about dragons
Films shot in British Columbia
2000s American films
2000s Canadian films